Tang-e Man (also Romanized as Tang-e Mān; also known as Jamālābād) is a village in Tashan Rural District, Riz District, Jam County, Bushehr Province, Iran. At the 2006 census, its population was 694, in 144 families.

References 

Populated places in Jam County